Eupithecia dayensis is a moth in the  family Geometridae. It is found in Djibouti.

References

Moths described in 1983
dayensis
Fauna of Djibouti
Moths of Africa